Smith Memorial Library is a member of the Chautauqua-Cattaraugus Library System, located on Bestor Plaza on the grounds of Chautauqua Institution in Chautauqua, New York.

The library was constructed from a $69,000 gift willed from the estate of Mrs. A.M. Smith Wilkes. The library serves as caretaker of the Chautauqua Institution Archives, including all Chautauqua Press publications from as early as 1876. It also houses objets d'art, books, and journals which Mrs. A.M. Smith Wilkes collected on her travels.

The building is a contributing property in the Chautauqua Institution Historic District.

References

Chautauqua Institution
National Register of Historic Places in Cattaraugus County, New York
Historic district contributing properties in New York (state)
Libraries on the National Register of Historic Places in New York (state)